Asciano railway station is an Italian railway station on the Siena-Chiusi railway line in Southern Tuscany. It serves as a junction for the line to Monte Antico.

History
It was opened on 11 September 1859 as an intermediate station on the Siena-Chiusi railway. In 1872, a new line opened to connect Grosseto and Siena, which branches off the main line here. Until 1927, it was the only connection between the two cities however a new line opened between Siena and Monte Antico, meaning traffic was significantly reduced on the section between here and Monte Antico, eventually closing to regular passenger services in 1994. Since then, regular passenger services have continued to serve this station on journeys between Siena and Chiusi-Chianciano Terme. The station has a turntable, which is occasionally used for steam locomotives that run along the Asciano-Monte Antico railway.

Train services and movements
Regular passenger services to the station consist solely of regionale services, which run every day to Siena and Chiusi-Chianciano Terme, with one evening return service continuing to Empoli. The station is served by Treno Natura steam or diesel historical trains that run occasionally for tourists.

Gallery

See also

History of rail transport in Italy
List of railway stations in Tuscany
Rail transport in Italy
Railway stations in Italy

References 

Railway stations in Tuscany
1859 establishments in Italy
Asciano
Railway stations in Italy opened in the 19th century